Punarjani is a 2003 Indian Malayalam-language drama film written and directed by Major Ravi and Rajesh Amanakara, and starring Pranav Mohanlal. The film was produced by P. L. Thenappan under the production house Sri Rajlakshmi Films. Pranav Mohanlal won the Kerala State Film Award for Best Child Artist for his performance in the film.

Plot
The story is about an 11-year-old child Appu who has a feeling that his mother gives more love and attention to his younger brother. Though Appu argues with his mom to give his younger brother the same workload as he does, he is the one who goes to the temple early morning to sing the Sopanam after which he provides milk to a tea shop and then goes to school.

His only friend is the Swamiji who sits next to the temple and tells him the stories of the famous "Naranathu Bhrandhan". Appu at times even imagines himself as Naranathu Bhrandhan. Over a period of time he is convinced that his mom loves only his younger brother and this feeling heads Appu to consider his younger brother as his enemy.

One day due to some reason Appu hurts his younger brother. After seeing his brother bleeding and unconscious, Appu runs away from the village and ending up with a child labour broker. Appu is employed under contract at a rich man's house. The rich man's children treat him very badly, which drives Appu into the past memories of his mother. Running away from there he lands up in the hands of another child labour contractor where again he is cheated.

All this makes Appu to develop a good feeling for his mother and brother. One night after a dream about his mother, he leaves the town and returns home to see his mother. It was too late by then as his mother died. Now he misses something in life. Life takes a new turn for Appu when he decides to stay back at home and take care of his brother leaving us with a message.

Cast
 Pranav Mohanlal as Appu
 Urmila Unni
 Jagannathan
 Anila Sreekumar
 Master Vishnu Soman
 Major Ravi
 Arjun Ravi
 Rohith Dananjayan

Soundtrack
The film features two songs composed by Dr. Suresh Manimala.

Accolades

References

External links
 
 Malayalachalachithram
 Malayalasangeetham

2003 films
2000s Malayalam-language films
Films directed by Major Ravi